is a distant trans-Neptunian object that was discovered well beyond  from the Sun. It was first observed on 10 November 2018 by astronomers Scott Sheppard, David Tholen, and Chad Trujillo during a search for distant trans-Neptunian objects whose orbits might be gravitationally influenced by the hypothetical Planet Nine. They announced their discovery on 17 December 2018 and nicknamed the object "Farout" to emphasize its distance from the Sun.

For comparison, the semi-major axis of the planetoid and possible dwarf planet 90377 Sedna is about 500 AU.

Observations of  show that it appears pinkish in color, indicative of an ice-rich surface.

Discovery 

 was discovered by astronomers Scott Sheppard, David Tholen, and Chad Trujillo at the Mauna Kea Observatory in Hawaii on 10 November 2018. The discovery formed part of their search for distant trans-Neptunian objects (TNOs) with orbits that may be gravitationally perturbed by the hypothesized Planet Nine. The search team had been involved in the discoveries of several other distant TNOs, including the sednoids  and 541132 Leleākūhonua.  was first identified as a faint object slowly moving in two images taken with the 8.2-meter Subaru Telescope on the night of 10 November 2018. At the time of discovery,  was located in the constellation Taurus, at a very faint apparent magnitude of 24.6, approaching the lowest detectable magnitude limit for most telescopes.

's low on-sky motion and brightness indicated that it is very distant, which prompted additional follow-up observations to constrain its orbit and distance. The object was reobserved in December 2018 by Sheppard at the Las Campanas Observatory, with observation times spanning ten days. However, its orbit remained with a significant uncertainty due to its short observation arc. Nonetheless, the discovery of  along with a preliminary orbit solution was formally announced in a Minor Planet Electronic Circular issued by the Minor Planet Center on 17 December 2018.

Since the discovery announcement,  has been periodically observed by Sheppard at the Las Campanas and Mauna Kea observatories. Additional observations were also made at the Roque de los Muchachos Observatory in November 2019 and January 2020. ,  has been observed for over five oppositions, with an observation arc of 16 years (5,900 days). Several precovery observations of  have been identified in images taken by the Cerro Tololo Observatory's Dark Energy Camera on 11 March 2015 and 16 January 2017, as well as images taken by the Canada-France-Hawaii Telescope and Subaru Telescope in 2003 and 2005, respectively.

Nomenclature 
Upon the announcement of 's discovery, the discoverers nicknamed the object "Farout" for its distant location from the Sun, and particularly because it was the farthest known TNO observed at the time. On the same day, the object was formally given the provisional designation  by the Minor Planet Center. The provisional designation indicates the object's discovery date, with the first letter representing the first half of November and the succeeding letter and numbers indicating that it is the 457th object discovered during that half-month. The object has not yet been assigned an official minor planet number by the Minor Planet Center due to its short observation arc and orbital uncertainty.  is expected to receive a minor planet number once it has been observed for over at least four oppositions, which would take several years. Once it receives a minor planet number, the object will be eligible for naming by its discoverers.

Orbit and classification 

 is the second-most distant observed Solar System object from the Sun and is the first object discovered while beyond 100 astronomical units (AU), overtaking the dwarf planet  (96 AU) in observed distance. For comparison, the distances of the Pioneer 10 and Voyager 2 space probes were approximately 128 AU and 126 AU in 2021, respectively. At its nominal distance,  is thought to be close to the heliopause, the boundary where the Sun's solar wind is stopped by the interstellar medium at around 120 AU. The new orbit determination indicates that this object is currently very close to aphelion which it should reach in mid-2067, and that it is a member of the scattered disc.

At the time of discovery on 10 November 2018, 's distance from the Sun was 123.4 AU, and has since moved 0.2 AU from the Sun . For example, Caesar's Comet (C/-43 K1) is over 800 AU from the Sun while Comet Donati (C/1858 L1) is over 145 AU from the Sun .

's average orbital distance from the Sun is approximately 81 AU, taking approximately 738 years to complete one full orbit. With an orbital eccentricity of about 0.53, it follows a highly elongated orbit, varying in distance from 38.3 AU at perihelion to 125.0 AU at aphelion. Its orbit is inclined to the ecliptic plane by about 24 .3 degrees, with its aphelion oriented below the ecliptic. At perihelion,  approaches close to Neptune's orbit without crossing it, having a minimum orbit intersection distance of approximately 8 AU. Because  approaches Neptune at close proximity, its orbit has likely been perturbed and scattered by Neptune; thus, it falls into the category of scattered-disc objects.  last passed perihelion in the late 17th century.

While  is one of the most distant objects observed, it does not have the largest orbital semi-major axis. For comparison, the semi-major axis of the planetoid 90377 Sedna is about 500 AU. In an extreme case, the scattered-disc object  has a semi-major axis around 1,400 AU, though its distance from the Sun  is about 64 AU, approximately half 's distance from the Sun in that year.

 was discovered in a particular region of the sky where other extreme TNOs have been found, suggesting that its orbit may be similar to those of extreme TNOs, which characteristically have distant and highly elongated orbits that may have resulted from the gravitational influence of the hypothetical Planet Nine. 's nominal orbit appears to be anti-aligned with Sedna; the longitude of pericenter of 's orbit is oriented about 193 degrees from Sedna's orbit.

Physical characteristics 
Based on its apparent brightness and large distance, the 's absolute magnitude estimated to be in the range of 3.4–4.5. According to the Minor Planet Center, it is the ninth intrinsically brightest scattered-disc object.

The albedo (reflectivity) of  has not been measured nor constrained, thus its diameter could not be calculated with certainty. This size range is considered to be large enough such that the body can collapse into a spheroidal shape, and thus be a dwarf planet. Astronomer Michael Brown considers  to be highly likely a dwarf planet, based on his size estimate of  calculated from an albedo of 0.12 and an absolute magnitude of 3.9.

Apart from its color, the spectrum and surface composition of  have not yet been measured in detail and will require further observations.

See also 

 , nicknamed "FarFarOut" by its discoverers
 List of Solar System objects by greatest aphelion
 List of Solar System objects most distant from the Sun
 List of trans-Neptunian objects

Notes

References

External links

 Discovered: The Most-Distant Solar System Object Ever Observed – Carnegie Science press release
 Farout Images  – Discovery images of  taken with the Subaru Telescope
 It’s the Solar System's Most Distant Object. Astronomers Named It Farout. – The New York Times article by Kenneth Chang
 Meet your very, *very* distant solar system neighbor 2018 VG18 – Bad Astronomy blog by Phil Plait
 List Of Centaurs and Scattered-Disk Objects – Minor Planet Center
 

Minor planet object articles (unnumbered)